Renaissance Square, known commonly as Veratsnound or Revival Square is the main square in Stepanakert, the capital of the self-proclaimed Republic of Artsakh. It was built in 1994 following the Battle of Shushi and the securing of the area by the Artsakh Defense Army.

Landmarks and buildings
The following landmarks and buildings are located on the square:

 Presidential Palace
 Artsakh Freedom Fighters Union building
 National Assembly of Artsakh
 Embassy of Armenia
 Palace of Youth
 Armenia Hotel

Presidential Palace
The Presidential Palace is the current residence of the President of Artsakh. It is the former building of the Nagorno-Karabakh Regional Committee of the Communist Party of Azerbaijan, having been built in the 1960s.

Activities on the square 
The square commonly hosts political and social rallies, weapons exhibitions, New Year's Eve events and processions. During the Shushi Liberation Day celebrations, a military parade of the Defence Army takes place. During a visit to the capital in August 2019, Armenian Prime Minister Nikol Pashinyan led a mass rally on the square with chants of  "Unification", which was originally chanted during the Karabakh movement in the late 80s.

Gallery

References

External links
Renaissance Square, Stepanakert, National Assembly on Aviplatform.com 
360° view of the square
A video of the square

Stepanakert
National squares
Buildings and structures in Stepanakert
Squares in Asia
Squares in Europe
1994 establishments in the Republic of Artsakh